Jung Dae-Sun (Hangul: 정대선; born 27 June 1987) is a South Korean football player who plays for Chiangmai.

External links

1987 births
Living people
Association football forwards
South Korean footballers
Ulsan Hyundai FC players
Gyeongnam FC players
FC Anyang players
Hwaseong FC players
K League 1 players
K League 2 players
Footballers from Seoul